Dyscinetus is a genus of rice beetles in the family Scarabaeidae. There are more than 20 described species in Dyscinetus.

Species
These 24 species belong to the genus Dyscinetus:

 Dyscinetus australis Joly & Escalona, 2002
 Dyscinetus bitumerosus Casey
 Dyscinetus dubius (Olivier, 1789)
 Dyscinetus dytiscoides Arrow, 1911
 Dyscinetus fimosus (Herbst, 1789)
 Dyscinetus gagates (Burmeister, 1847)
 Dyscinetus hypocrita Martínez
 Dyscinetus imitator Ratcliffe, 1986
 Dyscinetus laevicollis Arrow, 1937
 Dyscinetus laevipunctatus Bates, 1888
 Dyscinetus martinezi Joly & Escalona, 2002
 Dyscinetus mendax Joly & Escalona, 2010
 Dyscinetus minor Chapin, 1935
 Dyscinetus morator (Fabricius, 1798) (rice beetle)
 Dyscinetus olivaceus Höhne, 1923
 Dyscinetus ornaticaudus Ratcliffe, 1986
 Dyscinetus paradytis (Ponchel & Dechambre, 2003)
 Dyscinetus picipes (Burmeister, 1847)
 Dyscinetus plicatus (Burmeister, 1847)
 Dyscinetus questeli Chalumeau, 1982
 Dyscinetus rhomboidalis Casey
 Dyscinetus rugifrons (Burmeister, 1847)
 Dyscinetus sculptus Dupuis, 2006
 Dyscinetus subsericeus (Burmeister, 1847)

References

Further reading

External links

 

Dynastinae
Articles created by Qbugbot